Transient is a 2004 studio album by Gaelle Adisson.

Track listing
"Falling" - 6:15
"Parkway" - 4:13
"Give It Back" - 4:23
"Fade Away" - 4:00
"Haiti (Interlude)" - 2:35
"Love U More" - 4:03
"Repetition" - 5:28
"Shape Shifting" - 2:14
"Transient" - 4:59
"Rain" - 5:30
"Separate Rooms" - 5:11
"Moonsglow" - 5:29

Personnel
Dave Boonshoft - executive producer
Gaelle - vocals, background vocals, composer, producer
Emily Lazar - mastering
Eric Stamile - audio engineer, mixing, producer, programming
Brian Turner - drum loop
Britt Turner - loops
Kebe Williams - saxophone
Ede Wright - guitar

Reception
A BBC Music review commented "Her dry and introspective tone complement[s] her impassioned lyrics, and perfectly suit[s] the cool jazz backing that makes up the majority of this voyage of self-discovery."

References

2004 debut albums
Gaelle albums